Neaera is a genus of flies in the family Tachinidae.

Species
N. laticornis (Meigen, 1824)
N. leucoptera (Johnson, 1907)
N. mirabilis (Townsend, 1908)
N. robertsonii (Townsend, 1892)

References

Tachininae
Diptera of Europe
Tachinidae genera
Taxa named by Jean-Baptiste Robineau-Desvoidy